The 1995–96 Colonial Hockey League season was the fifth season of the Colonial Hockey League, a North American minor professional league. Nine teams participated in the regular season and the Flint Generals won the league title.

Regular season

Colonial Cup-Playoffs

External links
 Season 1995/96 on hockeydb.com

United Hockey League seasons
CHL
CHL